Samy Smaili (born 24 November 1965) is a French football manager who last managed the Djibouti women's national football team.

Career

In 2000, Smaili was appointed manager of French seventh tier side Taissy, helping them earn promotion to the French fifth tier within 4 seasons. In 2005, he was appointed manager of Saint-Quentin in the French fifth tier, helping them earn promotion to the French fourth tier. In 2009, he was appointed manager of French sixth tier club Reims Sainte-Anne. In 2012, Smaili was appointed manager of Charleville-Mézières in the French seventh tier, helping them earn promotion to the French sixth tier.

Before the second half of 2014–15, he was appointed manager of French sixth tier club Prix-lès-Mézières. In 2016, he was appointed manager of Racing (Luxembourg) in Luxembourg. In 2017, Smaili was appointed manager of the Luxembourg women's national football team. In 2020, he was appointed manager of the Djibouti women's national football team.

References

External links
 

1965 births
Living people
AS Prix-lès-Mézières managers
Championnat National 2 managers
Championnat National 3 managers
Expatriate football managers in Djibouti
Expatriate football managers in Luxembourg
French expatriate football managers
French expatriate sportspeople in Luxembourg
French football managers
OFC Charleville managers
Olympique Saint-Quentin managers